George Camacho (16 October 1918 – 6 May 2002) was a Guyanese cricketer. He played in fifteen first-class matches for British Guiana from 1943 to 1954.

See also
 List of Guyanese representative cricketers

References

External links
 

1918 births
2002 deaths
Guyanese cricketers
Guyana cricketers
Sportspeople from Georgetown, Guyana